The Norwegian Post Organisation (DNP) was a trade union representing postal workers in Norway.

The union was founded in 1977, when the National Union of Postal Clerks merged with the Norwegian Union of Postal Officials.  It affiliated to the Norwegian Confederation of Trade Unions, and by 1983, it had 13,015 members.  This rose to 14,366 in 1996.

In 2000, the union merged with the Norwegian Union of Postmen, to form the Norwegian Post and Communications Union.

Presidents
1977: Gunnar Solvang
1981: Anders Renolen
1985: Arild Øynes
c.1990: Morten Øye
1999: Randi Løvland

References

Postal trade unions
Trade unions established in 1977
Trade unions disestablished in 2000
Trade unions in Norway